TVQ is the Brisbane television station of Network Ten in Australia.

TVQ may also refer to:

Television
 TVQ Kyushu Broadcasting, a television station in Fukuoka, Japan
 Télé-Québec, a French-language TV network
 Television Quarterly, a magazine published by NATAS
 KTVQ, station TVQ in region K; a TV station in Billings, Montana, USA
 KTVQ (Oklahoma City), former station TVQ in region K; a defunct TV station in Oklahoma City, Oklahoma, USA
 WTVQ, station TVQ in region W; a TV station in Lexington, Kentucky, USA

Other uses
 Taxe de vente du Québec, the French name for Quebec Sales Tax, the provincial tax on goods and services in Quebec, Canada; and marked on bills and receipts
 Smartwings Slovakia (ICAO airline code TVQ)

See also